Adventures with Kanga Roddy is a children's television series created by martial arts masters George Chung and Anthony Chan and executive produced by former 49ers Joe Montana and Ronnie Lott.

Premise
Each episode of the Kanga Roddy series focuses on a group of children at a community center and their teachers (played by Jennifer Montana and Karen Lott, wives of former San Francisco 49ers football players, Joe Montana and Ronnie Lott), working on activities such as reading, physical fitness and arts and crafts. During these activities, the children encounter an ethical or social problem, which cause uneasiness or unhappiness among some of the children. The teachers sense the problem and suggest that the children seek help from their friend Uncle Pat, the proprietor of a rare bookstore, played by actor Pat Morita. Uncle Pat, with the assistance of his pet bookworm, Shakespeare, magically transports the children to the land of Hi-Yah where Kanga Roddy lives. Once in the land of Hi-Yah, Kanga Roddy and his friends Bantu - a female African snake, Tackle Bear - his workout partner, Cimbop and Kimbop - a pair of feline sisters, and Zatochi - a wise old snow monkey, help the children solve their problem by giving examples presented through songs. Kanga Roddy gets inspiration for a proper solution to the problem through flashbacks to lessons learned from his martial arts teacher Zatochi or parallels drawn from encounters with his buddy Tackle Bear. The children and the costumed cast present the answers in song and dance routines. When the children return to the community center, they review what they have learned with their teachers.

Cast
 Pat Morita as Uncle Pat - Uncle Pat is a wise bookseller who owns a rare book store next to the community center. He was educated at Oxford, and his love for knowledge has taken him around the world. In his spare time, he tries to read every book in the store! He loves to pass along the knowledge and wisdom he's gained in his travels and his reading. The bookstore is a magical window to the world, where he can send the children to the land of Hiyah so that their questions may be answered by a combination of wisdom and reflection. Uncle Pat's philosophy is this: a smart person is not one who knows all the answers, but one who knows the right questions
 Jennifer Montana as Miss Lisa - Miss Lisa is a former professional volleyball player who graduated from UCLA with a master's degree in physical education. She teaches physical education at the community center, where she shares her knowledge about teamwork and team spirit with the children, and helps them learn how to use these principles in handling problems. 
 Karen Lott as Miss Becky - Miss Becky is an artist by trade who studied art with many great masters at the Sorbonne in Paris. She finds great satisfaction in teaching kids a love of art. Miss Becky has a group of celebrity friends whom she knows as a result of her work, and she brings many of them to the community center to share their knowledge with the children
 Marissa Cheung as Amy - Amy is a very smart girl. When she grows up, she wants to be President of the United States, or the leader of a large company. She is an unusual combination of quiet and bossy. Amy doesn't say very much, but when she does, it's important!
 Tyler Johnson as Billy:  Billy is the class clown! He's very smart and sometimes he can be very arrogant. Billy's silliness has caused people to be upset, so he is learning restraint and respect for the feelings of other people. 
 Jafar Woods as Dwain - Dwain is a dancer, and he is smart, solid, and cool. He has asthma, and works hard to overcome it so that he can succeed in his ambition to become an athlete when he grows up.
 Cori Najarian as Kelly:  Kelly is happiest when she's the center of attention. She has the most to learn about social skills and other people's feelings. Kelly sings like an angel and wants to be an actress when she grows up.
 Alison Miller as T.J. - T.J. is a singer and dancer with lots of personality. She has amazing artistic talent, which allow her to hide the fact that she isn't the best student. T.J. is learning that she needs to apply herself more to her studies.
 Kamela Portuges as Shakespeare - Shakespeare, the bookworm, is Uncle Pat's daffy, overly dramatic companion. She is so caught up in the books and information that she is overwhelmed and has a hard time seeing the forest for the trees. Her confusion is a constant source of bemused irritation to Uncle Pat.

Land of Hiyah

 Mickey Thomas (voice) and James Harris (costume) as Kanga Roddy - Kanga Roddy is a seven-foot tall kangaroo who is a master of the martial arts. His philosophy is to never use the martial arts to fight or hurt anyone. Kanga Roddy acts as the children's teacher while they are in the land of Hiyah. He teaches by example and is able to guide the children to find their own answers rather than impose his own. Kanga Roddy understands that every day there is something new the world can teach us.
 Jeanie Tracy as Bantu - Bantu is a soul-singing mamba snake. Her purity comes from the heart and she could never harm a soul because she is filled with love and compassion. Her wisdom comes from her wealth of musical knowledge and she teaches lessons of wisdom and love through her songs.
Tony Lindsay as Tackle Bear - Tackle Bear is full of energy much like his best friend, Kanga Roddy. However, he lacks the intelligence, insightfulness and patience that Kanga Roddy has. Although Tackle Bear always means well, he lacks the ability to articulate the message. He is physically very capable and strong, but he shoots from the hip and sometimes could be a loose cannon when it comes to words, thereby giving comic relief.
Chaka - Chaka is an old friend of Kanga Roddy and Tackle Bear. They used to do everything together, until Chaka had to move away. Kanga and Tackle missed him terribly, and walked around feeling sad all the time until they realized that as long as they had their memories of Chaka, he would always be there in their hearts. People may have to go away, but memories last forever.
Zatochi - Zatochi is a thousand-year old snow monkey who is from the mountains of the Himalayas. He is different from most in that he lives his life backwards, starting with great wisdom and getting younger and more vital with each passing day. He is as comfortable with an ancient scroll of knowledge as he is surfing the web on his ultrafast laptop computer. Zatochi's greatest love has always been the martial arts and he has trained many great people through time, including Kanga Roddy.

Episodes

Series overview

Season 1 (1998–99)

Season 2 (2000)

Production
The show was created by martial arts masters George Chung and Anthony Chan who wanted to change the perception of the arts created by shows like Teenage Mutant Ninja Turtles and Power Rangers which exploit violence and instead wanted families to focus on the philosophical elements of martial arts—honor, courage and respect. Initially 13 half-hour episodes of the Kanga Roddy series were produced. One month after its debut, KTEH ordered 26 additional episodes and two one hour specials. The final broadcast of Adventures with Kanga Roddy occurred March 31, 2001 with an airing of episode 13 'We Are Family'; the following month, the show was dropped from KTEH's schedule for good.

Merchandise
An interactive CD-ROM was produced by Brighter Child featuring the character of Kanga Roddy.

Home media
In December 1998, it was reported Blockbuster had signed a deal to carry "Adventures with Kanga Roddy" VHSs at their stores for January 1999.

The series had the following VHS releases:

References

External links
 

1998 American television series debuts
2000 American television series endings
1990s American children's television series
2000s American children's television series
1990s preschool education television series
2000s preschool education television series
American children's adventure television series
American children's musical television series
American preschool education television series
American television shows featuring puppetry
English-language television shows
PBS Kids shows
PBS original programming
Television series about kangaroos and wallabies